Vivianne Collins is a television host and actress known for Filth City (2017), Conviction (2016), and Nickelodeon Robot Wars (2002) and presenting You're On! (1998 - 1999).

Filmography

References

External links
Official website

American game show hosts
Living people
American women television presenters
1973 births